János Benyik (born 4 June 1951) is a Hungarian former professional tennis player.

Biography
Benyik, a right-handed player, was a two-time Hungarian national champion and competed on the professional tour in the 1970s.

While playing on the Grand Prix circuit he had wins over Frank Froehling, Paolo Bertolucci and Eliot Teltscher. He twice reached the quarter-finals of the Austrian Open and as a doubles player was a finalist at Shreveport in 1975.

His only grand slam singles main draw appearance came at the 1976 French Open, where his first round opponent Antonio Muñoz won after being two sets down.

Between 1976 and 1983 he played 16 Davis Cup matches for Hungary, all in singles, from a total of nine ties. He later served as Hungary's Davis Cup captain and led the side to an upset win over Australia in 1995 to qualify for the World Group.

Grand Prix career finals

Doubles: 1 (0–1)

See also
List of Hungary Davis Cup team representatives

References

External links
 
 
 

1951 births
Living people
Hungarian male tennis players
20th-century Hungarian people
21st-century Hungarian people